Kauth is a surname of German origin. Notable people with the surname include:

Kathleen Kauth (born 1979), American ice hockey player
Kenneth Kauth (1924–2019), American politician

See also
Kout na Šumavě

References

Surnames of German origin